USS Balch (DD-363) was a Porter-class destroyer in the United States Navy. She is named for Admiral George Beall Balch.

Construction and commissioning
The second Balch was launched 24 March 1936 by Bethlehem Shipbuilding Corporation's Fore River Shipyard in Quincy, Massachusetts; sponsored by Miss Gertrude Balch, granddaughter of Admiral Balch; and commissioned 20 October 1936.

Service history
After her commissioning, Balch operated for a period under the Chief of Naval Operations. She departed Newport, Rhode Island, for the Pacific in October 1937, and upon arrival at San Diego, California, she joined Destroyer Division 7, Battle Force. Thereafter as flagship of Destroyer Squadron 12, and later of Destroyer Squadron 6, she participated in fleet training, cruises, and battle problems in the Pacific and Haitian-Caribbean area. After participating in Fleet Problem XXI at Pearl Harbor, Balch steamed to Mare Island Navy Yard where she underwent a yard period in the spring of 1940. Upon the completion of her yard period, she made six cruises alternately between the Hawaiian Islands and the west coast (August 1940-December 1941).

World War II
On 1 December 1941, Balch put to sea as a unit of Task Force 8, and remained with the Task Force after the Pearl Harbor attack. She cruised in the Pacific during the early months of the war, and participated in the bombardment of Tarawa Island, Marshall Islands (1 February 1942).

On 15 July 1944, Balch arrived at New York. Between 2 August 1944 and 23 May 1945, she completed five trans-Atlantic convoy escort crossings to various North African ports.

On 12 April 1945, Captain Alfred Lind took command and participated in Task Group 60.11 until 8 May 1945 (VE Day).  During this time, they rescued 46 survivors from a torpedoed SS Belgium (14 April) and also anchored at Oran, Algeria, and passed thru the Straits of Gibraltar.

On 16 June 1945, she commenced her pre-inactivation overhaul at Philadelphia, Pennsylvania. She was decommissioned 19 October 1945 and scrapped in 1946.

Awards
Balch received six battle stars for her Pacific service during World War II.

Notes

Sources

Porter-class destroyers
World War II destroyers of the United States
Ships built in Quincy, Massachusetts
1936 ships
Ships of the Aleutian Islands campaign